Ilus Vay (born Ilona Horváth; February 1923 – 28 October 2008) was a Hungarian actress. She died on 28 October 2008 at the age of 85 in Budapest.

Filmography 
Jómadár (in the role of Cake shop assistant) – 1943
Anyámasszony katonája (in the role of Éva) – 1943
Éjjeli zene (in the role of Governess of the Pallay daughters) – 1943
Magyar Sasok – 1944
A vadon fia – 1944
Mickey Magnate – 1948
A város alatt – 1953
Dollárpapa – 1956
Két vallomás – 1957
Házasságból elégséges – 1960
Mit csinált Felséged 3-tól 5-ig? (The Women of Szelistye) (in the role of a woman of Szelistye) – 1964
Özvegy menyasszonyok (Widowed Brides) (in the role of Nurse Jusztínia) – 1964
Sok hűség semmiért – 1966
Alfa Romeó és Júlia – 1968
A Halhatatlan légiós – 1971
Lila ákác (Purple Lilacs) – 1972
Az 1001. kilométer – 1973
Kínai kancsó – 1974
Süsü, a sárkány kalandjai (Süsü, the Dragon) (Youth Puppet TV Series) – 1976 (voice)
Akli Miklós – 1986
A három testőr Afrikában (The Three Musketeers in Africa) (in the role of Leila) – 1996
Szomszédok – 1997
Egy bolond százat csinál (One fool makes a hundred) (in the role of Margitka) – 2006

External links 
 

1923 births
2008 deaths
Actresses from Budapest
Hungarian film actresses
Hungarian stage actresses
Hungarian television actresses
Hungarian voice actresses
20th-century Hungarian actresses
21st-century Hungarian actresses